Gustav Niemann (Rheine, 9 February 1899 – Munich, 1 January 1982) was a mechanical engineering professor who is regarded as an expert in machine elements.

Biography 
Niemann studied mechanical engineering at the Technische Universität Darmstadt from 1919 to 1923. In 1928 he was promoted at the Technische Hochschule Berlin with the doctoral dissertation Über Wippkrane mit wagrechtem Lastwippweg (On Tower Cranes with Horizontal Load Yield). He taught at the Braunschweig University of Technology from 1934 to 1950, and at the Technische Universität München from 1951 to 1968. He was a recipient of the Grashof medal from the Verein Deutscher Ingenieure and the E. P. Connell medal from the American Gear Manufacturers Association, and was also an honorary member of the Japanese Society of Mechanical Engineers. Niemann was married to Marie-Luise (née Plaßmann, 1910 – 1987); the couple did not have any children.

Bibliography 
 Niemann, Gustav; Hirt, Manfred: Maschinenelemente. Springer, Berlin 1975, 1983. .
 Volume 1: Konstruktion und Berechnung von Verbindungen, Lagern, Wellen
 Volume 2: Getriebe allgemein, Zahnradgetriebe - Grundlagen, Stirnradgetriebe
 Volume 3: Schraubrad-, Kegelrad-, Schnecken-, Ketten-, Riemen-, Reibradgetriebe, Kupplungen, Bremsen, Freiläufe

References

External links 
 

1899 births
1982 deaths
People from Rheine
People from the Province of Westphalia
Mechanical engineers
Technical University of Berlin alumni
Technische Universität Darmstadt alumni